The Confederation of Protestant Churches in Lower Saxony is the union of the five regional Protestant churches located in the Lower Saxony. The confederation meets only tasks assigned to it by the national churches. It represents the interests of Protestant regional churches towards the state of Lower Saxony.

Member churches 
The Confederation of Protestant Churches in Lower Saxony represents about four million church members (as of 2010) in more than 2,200 communities. It comprises the following regionally delineated national churches, which are all member churches of the Evangelical Church in Germany (EKD):

 Evangelical Lutheran Church in Brunswick
 Evangelical Lutheran Church of Hanover
 Evangelical Lutheran Church in Oldenburg
 Evangelical Reformed Church in Germany
 Evangelical Lutheran Church of Schaumburg-Lippe

facilities 
The confederation runs common facilities for all member churches, including:

 Rechtshof as a common constitutional and administrative courts
 Labor and employment law committees
 Arbitration and conciliation commissions
 examination Office
Bodies under the auspices of the House of church Offices:
 Protestant village assistants work Niedersachsen (Evangelisches Dorfhelferinnenwerk Niedersachsen 
 Protestant adult education of Lower Saxony (EEB) (Evangelische Erwachsenenbildung Niedersachsen 
 Church service in the police and customs

Administration 
The confederation has a council of the Confederacy, in which the presiding Bishops and officials of the regional churches are represented.
The confederation has its own synod (church assembly). The Synod will decide on laws and finances of the Confederacy. The management of the Confederacy takes over an office that is housed in the regional church office in Hanover.

External links
http://www.evangelische-konfoederation.de/

Christianity in Lower Saxony
Evangelical Church in Germany